The men's high jump event at the 2006 Commonwealth Games was held on March 20–22.

Medalists

Results

Qualification
Qualification: 2.20 m (Q) or at least 12 best (q) qualified for the final.

Final

References
Results

High
2006